Jack Hyett (11 July 1915 – 21 July 2001) was an Australian teacher, broadcaster, author, naturalist and amateur ornithologist.  He was born in Ballarat, Victoria.  He was Foundation President of the Victorian Ornithological Research Group and the Ringwood Field Naturalists Club.  He served as editor of the Emu, the journal of the Royal Australasian Ornithologists Union 1965–1968.  In 1985 he was awarded the Australian Natural History Medallion.

As well as numerous journal and magazine articles, books authored by Hyett include:
 1959 - A Bushman's Year. F.W. Cheshire: Melbourne.
 1961 - A Bushman's Harvest. F.W. Cheshire: Melbourne.

References
 Bright Sparcs entry on Jack Hyett accessed 1 July 2007
 Rosanne Walker, 'Hyett, Jack (1915 - 2001)', Encyclopedia of Australian Science, created 8 February 2001, last modified 24 May 2006. Accessed 6 April 2011

Australian ornithologists
Australian naturalists
1915 births
2001 deaths
20th-century Australian zoologists
20th-century naturalists